Wednesday Night Live is a live album by Bryan Beller, who has worked with Mike Keneally, Steve Vai, and Dethklok. This album was released in 2011 under Onion Boy Records. The DVD version of this album was released in June 2011.

CD track listing
"Intro" – 0:26
"Greasy Wheel" – 7:07
"Life Story" – 3:31
"Get Things Done" – 8:11
"Thanks In Advance" – 8:39
"Love Terror Adrenaline/Break Through"  – 10:16
"Seven Percent Grade" – 6:46
"View" – 6:42
"Cave Dweller" – 8:04

DVD track listing
Intro 
Greasy Wheel 
Life Story 
Get Things Done 
Thanks In Advance 
Love Terror Adrenaline/BreakThrough 
Seven Percent Grade 
View 
Cave Dweller

Bonus videos
Cost Of Doing Business 
From Nothing 
See You Next Tuesday

Bonus audio remixes
Seven Percent Grade 
Supermarket People 
Get Things Done 
Wildflower

Personnel
Bryan Beller's Solo Band
Bryan Beller - bass (piano on track #8)
Griff Peters - guitar
Mike Keneally - keys (guitar on track #6)
Joe Travers - drums
Rick Musallam - guitar
Additional personnel
Pete Griffin - bass on "View"
Kira Small - keyboards on "View"

References

External links

2011 live albums
2011 video albums
Bryan Beller albums